{{Infobox film| name = Tropical Fish熱帶魚Rèdài Yú
| image = Tropical Fish (film).png
| caption = Taiwanese DVD cover
| director = 
| writer = Chen Yu-hsun
| producer = Chung Hu-pin
| starring = Lin Cheng-shengLin Chia-hungWen Ying
| music = Wu Bai & China Blue
| cinematography =
| editing =
| studio = Central Pictures Company
| released = 1995
| runtime = 108 minutes
| country = Taiwan
| language = Taiwanese, Mandarin Chinese
}}

Tropical Fish is a 1995 Taiwanese comedy-drama film written and directed by Chen Yu-hsun.  It is an example of New Taiwanese Cinema.

Plot

The movie tells the story of Liu Chih-chiang (劉志強, played by Lin Chia-hung [林嘉宏]), a disaffected Taipei high school student who is kidnapped and taken by Ah Ching (阿慶, played by the filmmaker Lin Cheng-sheng) to rural Chiayi County in southern Taiwan.

Locations
Chih-chiang's school scenes were filmed at Bailing Senior High School (百齡高中) in Shilin, Taipei, while several other scenes were filmed in Daan District. The kidnappers hold Chih-chiang in Dongshi, a coastal Chiayi County township noted for its oyster production.  The end of the film shows the business district of Dunhua Road in Taipei.

Music
In addition to the music score, two songs by Wu Bai & China Blue, "This Continuous Sinking" (繼續墮落) (from their 1994 album Wanderer's Love Song) and "Go to the Graveyard" (墓仔埔也敢去) are featured in the movie.  Different (live) versions of both songs were released on Wu Bai & China Blue's 1995 live album 伍佰的LIVE.

Awards
At Taiwan's 1995 Golden Horse Film Festival, Chen Yu-hsun won the award for Best Screenplay Originally Written for the Screen and Wen Ying (文英) won Best Supporting Actress for her role as Ah Yi'' (阿姨). Chen Yu-hsun was also nominated for a Golden Leopard for the film at the 1995 Locarno International Film Festival.

References

External links

1995 films
1995 comedy-drama films
Taiwanese comedy-drama films
Taiwanese-language films
1990s Mandarin-language films
Central Motion Picture Corporation films